Ilia Zhilin (born 10 May 1985) is a Russian male volleyball player. With his club Lokomotiv Novosibirsk he competed at the 2013 FIVB Volleyball Men's Club World Championship.

References

External links
 Ilia Žhilin at the International Volleyball Federation
 

1985 births
Living people
Russian men's volleyball players
Sportspeople from Kirov, Kirov Oblast
20th-century Russian people
21st-century Russian people